Vladimir Oiunovich Oidupaa (6 September 1949 – 25 September 2013) was a Tuvan musician, who performed Kargyraa and played bayan. He is considered one of the leading figures in the contemporary Tuvan music.

Oidupaa created his own style of kargyraa performance (high-tone kargyraa accompanied by the bayan), known as Oidupaa style and developed further by notable Tuvan performers including Chirgilchin. The Oidupaa style has been compared to Blues.

He spent 33 years in work camps for 3 counts of murder and corruption of a minor, however this remains a heavily debated topic as he maintained his innocence all throughout his life. During his time in the camps he learned to play the accordion, specifically the prison version with only buttons, and developed his unique style of Kargyraa. Also while in the camps, he converted to Christianity.

In 2007, Oidupaa appeared at the Channel One Russia in Moscow in one of the contest programs, but was booed from the podium before he could finish his performance, and Tatyana Tolstaya, one of the jury members, called his style "discordant" and "disharmonious". Oidupaa himself claimed later that he irritated her on purpose, to avoid the Channel broadcasting his records for free for two years in case he would win.

References

Tuvan musicians
1949 births
2013 deaths
Throat singing
Converts to Christianity
Russian Christians
20th-century Russian criminals
Russian prisoners and detainees
20th-century Russian musicians
21st-century Russian musicians